Taipei University of Marine Technology (Chinese:  台北海洋大學) is a light rail station on the Danhai light rail, which is operated by the New Taipei Metro. It is located at the Tamsui District, New Taipei, Taiwan.

Station overview 
The station is an at-grade station with 2 side platforms. It is located at Section 3, Binhai Rd, and as the name suggests, is located near the Taipei University of Marine Technology. It is part of the Blue Coast Line on the Danhai light rail, with its terminus being V26 Tamsui Fisherman's Wharf.

Station Layout

Around the Station 

 Taipei University of Marine Technology
 Shalun Night Market

History 
Construction of the station started on August 18, 2014, and the station opened on November 15, 2020

References 

Rail stations in Taiwan by operator